James Drewry Stewart,  (March 29, 1941December 3, 2014) was a Canadian mathematician, violinist, and professor emeritus of mathematics at McMaster University. Stewart is best known for his series of calculus textbooks used for high school, college, and university level courses.

Career
Stewart received his master of science at Stanford University and his doctor of philosophy from the University of Toronto in 1967. He worked for two years as a postdoctoral fellow at the University of London, where his research focused on harmonic and functional analysis. His books are standard textbooks in universities in many countries. One of his most well-known textbooks is Calculus: Early Transcendentals (1995), a set of textbooks which is accompanied by a website for students.

Stewart was also a violinist, and a former member of the Hamilton Philharmonic Orchestra.

Integral House 

From 2003 to 2009 a house designed by Brigitte Shim and Howard Sutcliffe was constructed for Dr. Stewart in the Rosedale neighbourhood of Toronto at a cost of $32 million. He paid an additional $5.4 million for the existing house and lot which was torn down to make room for his new home. Called Integral House (a reference to its curved walls, and their similarity to the mathematical integral symbol), the house includes a concert hall that seats 150. Stewart has said, "My books and my house are my twin legacies. If I hadn't commissioned the house I'm not sure what I would have spent the money on." Glenn Lowry, director of the Museum of Modern Art, called the house "one of the most important private houses built in North America in a long time."

Personal life 
Stewart was gay and involved in LGBT activism. According to Joseph Clement, a documentary filmmaker who is working on a film about Stewart and Integral House, Stewart brought gay rights activist George Hislop to speak at McMaster in the early 1970s, when the LGBT liberation movement was in its infancy, and was involved in protests and demonstrations.

Death 
In the summer of 2013, Stewart was diagnosed with multiple myeloma, a blood cancer. He died on December 3, 2014, aged 73.

Honours
In 2015, he was posthumously awarded the Meritorious Service Cross.

References

Further reading
  Article about Stewart's "Integral House".

External links
 
Stewart Calculus Official Biography
The house that math built by Katie Daubs at the Toronto Star
Integral Man , a documentary about Stewart and Integral House
 

1941 births
2014 deaths
Deaths from cancer in Ontario
Deaths from multiple myeloma
Canadian mathematicians
Canadian textbook writers
Canadian classical violinists
Canadian male violinists and fiddlers
Academic staff of McMaster University
Stanford University alumni
Academic staff of the University of Toronto
University of Toronto alumni
Canadian LGBT rights activists
Musicians from Toronto
Scientists from Toronto
Writers from Toronto
20th-century Canadian violinists and fiddlers
Canadian gay writers
Canadian LGBT scientists
Recipients of the Meritorious Service Decoration
20th-century Canadian male musicians
LGBT mathematicians
20th-century Canadian LGBT people
Canadian LGBT academics